Strange Weather may refer to:

  Strange Weather (EP), a 2014 EP by Anna Calvi
 Strange Weather (Glenn Frey album), 1992 
 Strange Weather (Marianne Faithfull album), 1987
 Strange Weather, 1992 album by Swedish dansband Lasse Stefanz
 Strange Weather (film), a 2016 American film
 Strange Weather (Joe Hill book), 2017